Bessera is a genus of Mexican plants in the cluster lily subfamily within the asparagus family. It is a small genus of 3 known species of mostly herbaceous flowering plants with corms. They have flowers with petals and petaloid sepals (tepals) with compound pistils.

The genus is named for Austrian and Russian botanist Wilibald Swibert Joseph Gottlieb von Besser (1784–1842).

Bessera elegans, called coral drops, is cultivated and is a half-hardy Mexican herbaceous plant growing from corms with drooping terminal umbels of showy red-and-white colored flowers.

Taxonomy

Species
Current species include:
Bessera elegans Schult.f. — central to southern Mexico.
Bessera tenuiflora (Greene) J.F.Macbr. — Baja California Sur state, including the southern Baja California Peninsula and Gulf of California islands; and the coastal region of mainland Northwestern Mexico.
Bessera tuitensis R.Delgad. — Jalisco state in coastal southwestern Mexico.

Former species
Some plants formerly classified as Bessera species have been reclassified under other genera, which include: Androstephium, Drypetes, Flueggea, Guapira, and Pulmonaria.
Former species include:
 Bessera azurea — Pulmonaria angustifolia 
 Bessera breviflora — Androstephium breviflorum
 Bessera calycantha — Guapira opposita
 Bessera inermis — Flueggea virosa 
 Bessera spinosa — Drypetes alba

References

Brodiaeoideae
Endemic flora of Mexico
Flora of Northwestern Mexico
Flora of Central Mexico
Flora of Southwestern Mexico
Asparagaceae genera